Dance Deewane 3 is the third season of the Indian dance reality television series Dance Deewane. It premiered on 27 February 2021 on Colors TV. The winner was Piyush Gurbhele.

Production 
Season 3 was initially scheduled to start in February 2020, but has been indefinitely postponed due to the COVID-19 pandemic in India. On 20 January 2021 a promo was released on Colors TV official Instagram. The show is hosted and presented by slow motion king Raghav Juyal. After he quits, the show was hosted by Haarsh Limbachiyaa and Bharti Singh.

Judges
The following are the judges of this season..

Main Judges
Madhuri Dixit
Tushar Kalia
Dharmesh Yelande

Guest Judge and Hosts
Punit Pathak (in place of Dharmesh in week 2, 3, and 4)
Nora Fatehi (in place of Madhuri in week 4, 5, 6, 19, 20, 21 and 22)
Haarsh Limbachiyaa and Bharti Singh (In week 4, 5, 6, 7, 8 and Continued when Raghav Juyal Quit)

Contestants

Top 18 Contestants

Wild-Cards

Summary 

  The contestant is from 1st Generation.
  The contestant is from 2nd Generation.
  The contestant is from 3rd Generation.

  The contestant was the Ultimate Winner.
  The contestant was the Winner of their Generation.
  The contestants were Finalists & eliminated during the final.
  The contestant received all 3 Plays & moved on to next round.
  The contestant received 2 Plays & moved on to next round.
  The contestant was safe.
  The contestant was got only 1 Play.
  The contestant was in the bottom.
  The contestant received Rewind & was Eliminated.
  The contestant was injured and had to leave the competition.

Guests

Through video conferencing

References

Indian dance television shows